The MetroWalk Shopping Center is a shopping mall in Zhongli District, Taoyuan, Taiwan that opened in 2001. There are shopping facilities such as the Eslite Bookstore inside the mall. In addition, Sega, a video game manufacturer, also has the first overseas branch of Joypolis, the company's theme park brand, in the shopping center.

Stores
UNIQLO
H&M
Zara
Muji
Studio A
Vue Cinemas
Sega
Starbucks
Eslite Bookstore

Gallery

See also
 List of tourist attractions in Taiwan
 Gloria Outlets

References

External links

MetroWalk Shopping Center Official Website

2001 establishments in Taiwan
Shopping malls in Taoyuan
Shopping malls established in 2001